Ágnes Sütő (born 8 October 1992) is an Icelandic artistic gymnast, and coach.

She represented her nation at international competitions. She competed at world championships, including the 2011 World Artistic Gymnastics Championships, 2013 World Artistic Gymnastics Championships, 2017 World Artistic Gymnastics Championships and 2018 World Artistic Gymnastics Championships.

References 

1992 births
Icelandic female artistic gymnasts
Living people